This is a list of the National Register of Historic Places listings in Llano County, Texas.

This is intended to be a complete list of properties and districts listed on the National Register of Historic Places in Llano County, Texas. There are three districts and four individual properties listed on the National Register in the county. One district is a National Natural Landmark while two other districts contain Recorded Texas Historic Landmarks (RTHLs) including one State Antiquities Landmark that is part of an individual listing along with another RTHL. Two additional individual listings are also RTHLs.

Current listings

The locations of National Register properties and districts may be seen in a mapping service provided.

|}

See also

National Register of Historic Places listings in Texas
Recorded Texas Historic Landmarks in Llano County

References

External links

Llano County, Texas
Llano County
Buildings and structures in Llano County, Texas